Charlemagne: The Omens of Death is the fourth and final album by actor and heavy metal singer Christopher Lee. It was released on 27 May 2013. It is a sequel to his album Charlemagne: By the Sword and the Cross (2010). The music was arranged by Judas Priest's Richie Faulkner, and features prominent Guatemalan guitar virtuoso and World Guitar Idol Champion Hedras Ramos on guitar, as well as his father, Hedras Ramos Sr, on bass.

On his 90th birthday (27 May 2012), Lee announced the release of the first single, "Let Legend Mark Me as the King", signifying his move onto "full on" heavy metal, after performing a more symphonic metal style on his prior releases. He was the oldest heavy metal performer in history. He was joined on the single by tenor Vincent Ricciardi, who also appeared on Charlemagne: By the Sword and the Cross.

Track listing

Personnel

Singers 
 Christopher Lee as Charlemagne (Ghost)
 Vincent Ricciardi as Young Charlemagne
 Phil S.P as Pippin the Short
 Mauro Conti as Pope Hadrian
 Lydia Salnikova as Hildegard
 Gordon Tittsworth as Roland
 Aaron Cloutier as Duke Lupo
 Daniel Vasconcelos as Oliver

Musicians 
 Hedras Ramos Jr. – guitars, composition ("The Devil's Advocate", "The Ultimate Sacrifice")  
 Hedras Ramos Sr. – bass guitar
 Ollie Usiskin – drums

Additional personnel 
 Richie Faulkner – arrangements
 Marco Sabiu – composer
 Marie-Claire Calvet – lyricist
 John Wistow – composer, lyricist

References

External links 

2013 albums
Death metal albums by English artists
Christopher Lee albums
Concept albums
Cultural depictions of Charlemagne